Hathigammana Grama Niladhari Division is a Grama Niladhari Division of the Nikaweratiya Divisional Secretariat of Kurunegala District of North Western Province, Sri Lanka. It has Grama Niladhari Division Code 305.

Hathigammana is a surrounded by the Budumuttawa, Diyagama, Hewenpelessa, Galapitiyagama, Kebellewa and Kaluwennewa Grama Niladhari Divisions.

Demographics

Ethnicity 
The Hathigammana Grama Niladhari Division has a Sinhalese majority (94.3%). In comparison, the Nikaweratiya Divisional Secretariat (which contains the Hathigammana Grama Niladhari Division) has a Sinhalese majority (95.6%)

Religion 
The Hathigammana Grama Niladhari Division has a Buddhist majority (93.2%). In comparison, the Nikaweratiya Divisional Secretariat (which contains the Hathigammana Grama Niladhari Division) has a Buddhist majority (93.9%)

References 

Grama Niladhari Divisions of Nikaweratiya Divisional Secretariat